Catherine Serre (b. 1954) is a French actress who graduated at conservatory in Nice. She is known for her credited roles in Moonraker where she played Countess Labinsky, one of the "perfect" human specimens from Drax's master race, and in the French Le gendarme et les gendarmettes films, where she appeared together with Nicaise Jean Louis, another Drax Girl from Moonraker. She has also appeared in nude pictorials in both Playboy and Mayfair magazines.

Filmography
1972: Les témoins - Une prêtresse
1976: La situation est grave... mais pas désespérée (The situation is serious but not hopeless)
1978: One Two Two - Liza
1979: Les givrés - La monitrice
1979: Moonraker - Countess Labinsky (Drax's Girl)
1979: LeGagnant - Micheline (Bank Teller)
1980: Je vais craquer - Malika
1980: Mon oncle d'Amérique - La secrétaire de la direction générale
1980: Un pas dans la forêt - Elsie
1981: Pétrole! Oil! Pétrole! - La vendeuse de porcelaine
1981: Le fils-père - Irène, la mère
1981: Ne me parlez plus jamais d'amour - Sandrine
1982: Allô oui? Listen! J'écoute! - Liliane
1982: Le gendarme et les gendarmettes - Christine Rocourt
1984: Disparitions (TV Series) - (final appearance)

External links

Sources 

1954 births
French film actresses
Living people